USS Margaret (ID-2510) – shortly thereafter known as USS Chatham (ID-2510) -- was a cargo ship acquired by the U.S. Navy during World War I. She was used to carry cargo to Allied troops in Europe until the war's end when she was returned to the U.S. Shipping Board for disposition.

Leased in New York 

Margaret, a 3,372 gross ton (7,523 tons displacement) freighter, was built at Sparrows Point, Maryland, in 1916. She was acquired on charter by the Navy from A. H. Bull Steamship Company, New York, New York, 13 March 1918.  She was commissioned in the Navy at New York City, as USS Margaret (ID # 2510) on 25 March 1918.

Margaret was assigned to the 3rd Naval District under Naval Overseas Transportation Service and was renamed USS Chatham on 18 April 1918, probably to avoid confusion with several other U.S. Navy vessels of the same name, most notably the converted yacht Margaret (SP-527).

World War I service 

On the same date, the freighter arrived in the Gironde River in France at the end of her first transatlantic convoy voyage from New York carrying Army supplies for the American Expeditionary Force. Chatham made four more such trips, delivering French steel billets and supplies for the Motor Transportation Corps to Le Havre in June for the Army of Occupation, general cargo to Rochefort in August and October, and more general cargo to Brest in December.

Post-service demobilization 

Upon returning to New York in late December 1918, she entered a shipyard for a complete overhaul and was soon designated for demobilization. USS Chatham was decommissioned on 10 February 1919 and transferred to the U.S. Shipping Board.

Subsequent maritime career 

Chatham was returned to her owners, the A.H. Bull Steamship Company of New York City. Reverting to the name Margaret, the ship appears to have continued to serve her original owners until she was sunk, without survivors, by the German submarine U-571 on 14 April 1942 off Cape Hatteras.

References
  
 Chatham 
 USS Chatham (ID # 2510), 1918-1919. Initially commissioned as USS Margaret. Originally, and later, S.S. Margaret (American Freighter, 1916). 

World War I auxiliary ships of the United States
Ships built in Sparrows Point, Maryland
Ships sunk by German submarines in World War II
Shipwrecks of the Carolina coast
Cargo ships of the United States Navy
Maritime incidents in April 1942
World War II shipwrecks in the Atlantic Ocean
1916 ships